The 1918–19 Yale Bulldogs men's ice hockey season was the 24th season of play for the program.

Season
After the armistice was signed in November 1918, many prospective college students began returning to the US. This allowed many universities to begin restarting their athletic programs. Yale was one of the few teams to have officially existed during the war but, despite that advantage, the Elis still had a great deal of difficulty in the spring semester. The agreement with the New Haven Arena had ended and the Bulldogs no longer had a permanent home. Additionally, many schools were not ready to field teams until February at the earliest, and even then only a few games were scheduled for most programs.

As a consequence, Yale played just two games during the season. They were, however, against the Elis' two biggest rivals at the time, providing some measure of normalcy for the student body.

With so few games, the team did not employ a coach for the season. As of 2020 this is the final season in which the Bulldogs did not have an official head coach. E. Harvey Cushing served as team manager instead.

Roster

Standings

Schedule and Results

|-
!colspan=12 style="color:white; background:#00356B" | Regular Season

References

Yale Bulldogs men's ice hockey seasons
Yale
Yale
Yale
Yale